Plopsa is the theme park division of Studio 100, the company operates 8 (water) parks across Belgium, The Netherlands, Germany and Poland.

History
Plopsa began its operation at the end of 1999 when Studio 100 acquired Meli Park in Adinkerke in the Municipality De Panne. After several renovations the park reopened as Plopsaland on 29 April 2000. Several attractions got a layover with Studio 100 characters, such as Kabouter Plop, Samson & Gert and Bumba.

In December 2005 the company opened a new indoor theme park in the Municipality Hasselt, named Plopsa Indoor Hasselt. This marked the opening of the first indoor theme park in Belgium. In the same year Plopsa also acquired Télécoo, an amusement park near the waterfalls of Coo. Several attraction got an overlay with Studio 100 characters, just like the attractions of the former Meli Park. July 2007 the park was renamed to Plopsa Coo.

In 2010 Plopsa crossed the Dutch and German border and opened an indoor theme park in Coevorden, similar to Plopsa Indoor Hasselt. The park officially opened its doors on 29 April 2010 and got the name Plopsa Indoor Coevorden. In Germany they acquired Holiday Park in Haßloch. Just like Meli Park and Télécoo the park got a layover with several Studio 100 characters. The name however remained the same.

In 2015 the company enterend a new form of park entertainment with the opening of Plopsaqua in De Panne, a water park themed to the Studio 100 character Vic the Viking. This park also received a subsidy from the Municipality, so the people of De Panne could use the facilities at a discount. Other Plopsaqua water parks are currently in active development throughout Belgium. The same year Studio 100/Plopsa opened their catalog of characters to other amusement park operators outside Belgium, The Netherlands, Germany, France and the United Kingdom. Mayaland Kownaty, Poland and the yet to be built theme park in Prague, Czech Republic are examples of this, since these parks are (partially) owned by an investment company. Steve van den Kerkhof (CEO of Plopsa) stated that there's also interest in the characters from companies in China, The United States of America, Australia and Canada 

The latest location opened in Torzym, Poland in September 2018 when Majaland Kownaty opened its doors. Majaland Kownaty is an indoor theme park similar to Plopsaland Coevorden in The Netherlands. In contrary to the other 6 parks this park is partially owned by an investment company. The theme park is doing so well that Plopsa and Momentum Capital decided to build three other parks in Poland in Warsaw, Gdańsk and Katowice.

At the end of 2019 Plopsa acquired the comic themed and struggling Comic Station, located in a terminal of Antwerp Central Station. The theme park closed for a partial refurbishment and opened in October 2021 as Plopsa Station Antwerp.

Theme parks, Water parks and other assets

List of all theme parks, water parks and other assets of Plopsa that are open or in active development.

Investments 
A list of all investments of the Plopsa Group in their current and new parks.

During a corruption investigation to a city official of The Hague in 2019 it was discovered that Plopsa was actively searching for a new site in The Netherlands to expand with a Plopsaqua and a possible second Plopsa Indoor. During an interview with RTL Nieuws Steve van den Kerkhof confirmed this and that Plopsa was in talks with the city of The Hague, but that they were also investigating other sites in The Netherlands. Since the interview no updates were given to the Dutch expansion.

References

External links
 Official Plopsa website
 Official Studio 100 website

Amusement parks in Belgium
Amusement parks in the Netherlands
Amusement parks in Germany
Amusement parks in Poland
Belgian companies established in 1999
Entertainment companies established in 1999
1999 establishments in Belgium